Parishkaram  is a 1991 Indian Telugu-language action film, produced by Pratapa Raju under the Nava Bharat Enterprises banner and directed by Tarani. It stars Jagapati Babu, Nagendra Babu, Vani Viswanath with music composed by Vidyasagar.

Plot
The film begins with an honest cop ACP Chandra Shekar loves and knits a beauty, Jyoti. Soon after, Shekar is seriously injured in a police operation by which he is paralyzed. Here Shekar goes into depression and doctors say that he requires mental peace, so, Jyoti takes him to his friend Vikram's guest house at a hill station where they are acquainted with a young guy Satyam. In his company, Shekar is relaxed from distress. Satyam gives Shekar natural therapy and contributes to a doctor who makes him normal through acupuncture. Currently, Shekar is suspicious about Satyam as he notices doctor qualities in him, so, he starts an investigation. 

Surprisingly, he realizes Satyam is a well-renowned Doctor Anand and a wanted criminal who absconded from the police. He also learns that the doctor who treated him is Anand's uncle. So, he immediately meets and inquires about the truth. Shockingly, the doctor replies that Shekar is responsible for this situation. Once Shekar & his friends Vikram & Venkat have an accident in which Shekar is seriously injured. Dr. Anand treats him and his blind wife Sudha Rani donates her blood. After that, Shekar leaves for police training unbeknownst to Anand. Tragically, venomous Vikram & Venkat molest Sudha Rani when furious Anand slays Venkat, and Vikram escapes. Thus, Anand is waiting for his arrival. Now Shekar decides to protect Anand. At the same time, Vikram returns and Anand moves to take his revenge. In the final combat, Shekar tries maximum extent to stop Anand, as a lack of choice he fires, but Anand accomplishes his avenge. Finally, the movie ends with Anand departing in Shekar's lap.

Cast
Jagapati Babu as ACP Chandra Shekar
Nagendra Babu as Satyam / Dr. Anand
Vani Viswanath as Jyothi
Sudhakar as Chalapathi
Rallapalli as Lady Boodaiah
Benerjee as Venkat
Mahohar as Vikram
Thyagaraju as Commissioner Krishna Murthy
Bhimeswara Rao as Doctor
Chitti Babu as Boodaiah's brother-in-law
Kinnera as Gowri
Gayatri as Sudha Latha
Athili Lakshmi as Jyothi's mother

Soundtrack

Music composed by Vidyasagar. Lyrics were written by Sirivennela Sitarama Sastry. Music released on LEO Audio Company.

References

External links
 

Films scored by Vidyasagar
1991 films
1990s Telugu-language films